Giovanni Falcone is a 1993 Italian biographical drama film written and directed by Giuseppe Ferrara. It is based on real life events of the prosecuting magistrate Giovanni Falcone who was killed by mafia in 1992.

Cast 
 Michele Placido as Giovanni Falcone
 Anna Bonaiuto as Francesca Morvillo
 Giancarlo Giannini as Paolo Borsellino
 Massimo Bonetti as Ninni Cassarà 
 Nello Riviè as Rocco Chinnici
 Gianni Musy as Tommaso Buscetta
 Marco Leto as Antonino Caponnetto
 Paolo De Giorgio as Calogero Zucchetto 
 Antonio Cantafora as Totò Inzerillo 
 Pietro Biondi as the "Dottore" (Bruno Contrada)
 Nino D'Agata as Totuccio Contorno 
 Fabrizio Gifuni as Roberto Antiochia 
 Gianfranco Barra as Vincenzo Geraci 
 Roberto Nobile as Judge Di Pisa
 Arnaldo Ninchi as Salvo Lima
 Giampiero Bianchi as Claudio Martelli
 Giovanni Pallavicino as Vito Ciancimino
 Luigi Angelillo as Ignazio Salvo 
 Francesco Bellomo as Francesco Marino Mannoia  
 Ivana Monti as Marcelle Padovani
 Gaetano Amato as Luciano Liggio

References

External links

1993 films
1990s biographical drama films
Films directed by Giuseppe Ferrara
Films about the Sicilian Mafia
Italian biographical drama films
Films scored by Pino Donaggio
1993 drama films
Cultural depictions of Italian men
1990s Italian films